A change of command is a military tradition that represents a formal transfer of authority and responsibility for a unit from one commanding or flag officer to another. The passing of colors, standards, or ensigns from an outgoing commander to an incoming one ensures that the unit and its soldiers is never without official leadership, a continuation of trust, and also signifies an allegiance of soldiers to their unit's commander.

Great symbolism is attached to the ceremonial aspects of a change of command. An inspection and review of soldiers, gun salutes, as well as a military band will often be incorporated into the ceremony.

For a Command Sergeant Major, the transferred item might be a saber during a Change of Responsibility, while for a Chaplain, the item might be the passing of a Clerical Stole.

See also

3-volley salute
21-gun salute
Burial at sea
Casing of the Colors
Color guard
Half-staff
Honor guard
Military funeral
Military rites
Missing man formation
Riderless horse
State funeral
Tomb of the Unknown Soldier

Footnotes

External links
 
34th Combat Communications Squadron (USAF) Change of Command Ceremony Video
Canadian Army Change of Command – 2016

Ceremonies
Military life
Military traditions
State ritual and ceremonies